La Viuda Island (The Widow Island), also known as Los Chimús Island, is an island of Peru.

The island received its name "The Widow" after the frigate Mercedes sank off the island's shores in 1852, drowning 1,200, including the boat captain, whose wife survived the tragedy.

Pacific islands of Peru